Telehit Awards  (Spanish: Premios Telehit) is a Mexican award that recognizes the greatest music events in Mexico, and broadcast by Telehit channel.

2008
List of winners:
Most Important Latin Artist in the World: Shakira
Best Mexican Performer Rock-Pop: Alejandra Guzmán
Contribution to the History of Rock: Enrique Bunbury
Special Award Musical Genius: Nacho Cano
Most successful Latin Artist Worldwide: Ricky Martin
Special Lifetime Achievement Award Musical: La Maldita Vecindad
More representative of the Rock Band closes: Jaguares
Contribution to the History of Rock: Saúl Hernández
Best Singer-Songwriter Pop Rock Music: Aleks Syntek
Public Song: "Te quiero" – Flex
Best Pop Artist of the Year: Enrique Iglesias

2009
List of winners:
Video of the Year: "La Perla" – Calle 13
Best Alternative Band: Plastilina Mosh
Best Young Band: División Minúscula
Award for Song of the Year: "Poker Face" – Lady Gaga
Award for Public Song 2009: "Pitbull"
National Rock Album: Reptilectric – Zoé
International Album of the Year: 95/08 Éxitos – Enrique Iglesias
Artist of the Year: Café Tacuba
Award Musical Genius: Gustavo Cerati
Telehit Most Popular Artist: Wisin & Yandel
Musical Career: Beto Cuevas
Young Artist of the Year: Ha*Ash
Special Award for his contribution to rock history: Santa Ana
Most Important Latin American Artist: Alejandro Sanz
Best Rock National: Jaguares
Pop Artist of the Year: La Quinta Estación
Artist Revelation: Juan Son
Hot Artist: Fanny Lú
Best International Youth Band: Tokio Hotel
Most Important Latin Artist in the World: Shakira
Mexican International Artist: Paulina Rubio
Best Rock National: Moderatto

2010
List of winners:
Artist of the Year: Enrique Iglesias
Video of the Year: "Telephone" – Lady Gaga featuring Beyoncé
National Rock Band: Zoé
Contribution History Rock n Roll: El Tri
Young Artist of the Year: Belinda
Most Popular Artist on Telehit: Pitbull
Musical career: Miguel Bosé
Artist Pop of the Year: Camila
Song of the Year: "Mientes" – Camila
Interpreter of the Year: Chayanne
Most Important Latin Artist: Ricky Martin
International Album of the Year: The Fame Monster – Lady Gaga
Musical Quality Award: Natalia Lafourcade
Song of the Public: "Colgando en tus manos" – Carlos Baute featuring Marta Sánchez
Revelation Artist: Jotdog
Alternative Band: DLD
International Youth Artist: Jonas Brothers
Rock Album in Spanish: Las consecuencias – Enrique Bunbury

2011 
List of winners:
Most Popular Artist on Telehit: Camila
Pop Artist of the Year: Enrique Iglesias
Song of the Public: "Party Rock Anthem" – LMFAO
Song of the Year: "Rabiosa" – Shakira
Artist of the Year: Lady Gaga
Video of the Year: "Born This Way" - Lady Gaga
Contribution to the History of Electronic Music: David Guetta
Revelation of the Year: Los Daniels
Youth Artist of the Year: Ximena Sariñana
International Youth Artist: Selena Gomez
Best alternative band: Enjambre
Best International Tour: Justin Bieber
Best Rock Album of the Year: Foo Fighters
Best Spanish-language singer-songwriter: Mario Domm
Most Important Latin Artist in the World: Ricky Martin
Best Telehit Comedy Program: Las Lavanderas

2012
List of winners:
Musical Genius: Caifanes
Musical Career: El Tri
Musical Quality: Calle 13
Best Program Telehit: Platanito Show
Best National Rock Band: Café Tacuba
Best National Rock Album: Sueño de la máquina – Kinky
Best National Pop Song: "Corre" – Jesse & Joy
Best International Rock Album: "Living Things" – Linkin Park
Song of the Year: "We Found Love" – Rihanna
Best International Pop Group: One Direction
Most Popular Artist in Telehit: One Direction
Hispanic Video of the Year: "Ódiame" – Enrique Bunbury
Video of the Year: "Boyfriend" – Justin Bieber
Hispanic Pop Artist of the Year: Enrique Iglesias

2013 
List of winners:
Female Pop Album: Red – Taylor Swift
Best National Rock Album: Primario – DLD
Best Rock Band: Muse
Best National Rock Band: Molotov
Best Male Pop Album: Unorthodox Jukebox – Bruno Mars
Prize to "National Musical Quality": Café Tacuba
Prize "International Musical Quality": Justin Timberlake
Most Popular Artist in Telehit: Justin Bieber
Best Telehit Comedy Program: Guerra de Chistes
Best Spanish Video: "En la Obscuridad" – Belinda
Boyband of the Year: One Direction
Song of the Year: "Blurred Lines" – Robin Thicke featuring T.I. & Pharrell Williams
National Pop Song: "En la Obscuridad" – Belinda
Song of the Public: "Beauty and a Beat" – Justin Bieber
Most Popular Video on Telehit: "Best Song Ever" – One Direction

2014 
List of winners:
Most Popular Video on Telehit: "Don't Stop" – 5 Seconds of Summer
Best National Rock Album: Molotov
Recognition of the musical trajectory: Kiss
Best Male Pop Record: x – Ed Sheeran
Best Rock Band: Paramore
Pop Rock Song of the Year: "Counting Stars" – OneRepublic
Music Genius 2014: Mario Domm
Song of the Year: "Happy" – Pharrell Williams
Best Dj of the Year: Calvin Harris
Best Video in Spanish: "I Love You... Te Quiero" – Belinda
Best National Rock Band: Café Tacvba
National Pop Song: Ángel cruel – CD9 
Video of the Year: "Dark Horse" – Katy Perry
Boyband of the Year: One Direction

2015 
List of winners:
Song of the Year: "Uptown Funk" – Mark Ronson featuring Bruno Mars
Musical Quality: Clean Bandit
Boyband of the Year: One Direction
Most Popular Video of the Year: Drag Me Down – One Direction
Best Female Solo Artist of the Year: Taylor Swift
Video of the Year: "Bad Blood (Taylor Swift song)" – Taylor Swift
Best Rock Band: Muse
Pop/Rock Song of the Year: "What I Like About You" – 5 Seconds of Summer
Pop Song in Spanish: "El Perdón" – Nicky Jam & Enrique Iglesias
Best Male Solo Artist of the Year: Enrique Iglesias
DJ of the Year: Robin Schulz
Best National Rock Band: DLD
Best Video in Spanish: "Ginza" – J Balvin
Musical career: Panteón Rococó

2016 
List of winners:
Best Male Solo Artist : Shawn Mendes
DJ of the Year: Calvin Harris
Best Rock Artist in Spanish: Mon Laferte
Video in Spanish more request in social networks: "Sin tu amor" – Mario Bautista
Best Pop Song in Spanish: "Duele el Corazón" – Enrique Iglesias featuring Wisin
Best Female Solo Artist: Rihanna
Urban Artist of the Year: Maluma
Best New Artist: DNCE
Telehit Prize to the Artistic Track: Molotov
Best Video in English: "Girls Talk Boys" – 5 Seconds of Summer
Artist of the Public: Fifth Harmony
Urban Song of the Year: "Hasta el Amanecer" – Nicky Jam
Video of the Year: "Up & Up" – Coldplay
Song of the Year: "Sorry" – Justin Bieber
Best Rock Band: Twenty One Pilots

2017 
List of winners:
Best Male Solo Artist : Shawn Mendes
DJ of the Year: Martin Garrix
Best Pop/Rock Artist in Spanish: Mon Laferte
Video in Spanish more request in social networks: "Hey DJ" – CNCO
Best Female Solo Artist: Demi Lovato
Best New Artist: Manuel Turizo
Telehit Prize to the Artistic Track: Maluma
Best Video in English: "Slow Hands" – Niall Horan
Artist of the Public: CD9
Urban Artist of the Year: J Balvin
Video of the Year: "Shape of You" – Ed Sheeran
Song of the Year: "Despacito" – Luis Fonsi & Daddy Yankee
Best Rock Band: Twenty One Pilots
Artist of the Decade: Enrique Iglesias
The Golden Butt: Nicki Minaj

Most number of wins

References

Lists of award winners